Virginie Fouquet (born 9 September 1975 at Lille) is a former French athlete, who specialized in the middle distances.

Biography  
She won three 800m  French Championships:    two Outdoor in 2001 and 2003, and one Indoor in 1998. In 2004, she became champion of France Indoors for the 400 meters.

Prize list  
 French Championships in Athletics   :  
 winner of the 800m 2001 and 2003      
 French Indoor Championships in Athletics:  
 winner of the 400m 2004   
 winner of the 800m 1998

Records

Notes and references

External links  
  Biography of Virginie Fouquet on the French Athletics Federation website   
    IAAF

1975 births
Living people
French female middle-distance runners
Sportspeople from Lille